Yesterdays is an album by Argentinian jazz composer and saxophonist Gato Barbieri featuring performances recorded in New York in 1974 and first released on the Flying Dutchman label. The album was rereleased in 1988 as The Third World Revisited with two additional tracks from El Pampero.

Reception

AllMusic awarded the album 4 stars stating "Tenor-saxophonist Gato Barbieri is in particularly fine form on this release, stretching out on four selections... Barbieri is often exuberant on this spirited and emotional set".

Track listing
 "Yesterdays" (Jerome Kern, Otto Harbach) - 10:43 	
 "A John Coltrane Blues" (John Coltrane) - 8:30 	
 "Marnie" (Bernard Herrmann, Gloria Shayne) - 7:09
 "Cariňoso" (Pixinguinha) - 10:52

Personnel
Gato Barbieri - tenor saxophone
Jorge Dalto - piano, electric piano
Paul Metzke - electric guitar
Ron Carter - electric bass  
Bernard Purdie - drums
Ray Mantilla - timbales
Babafemi - congas

References

1974 albums
Albums produced by Bob Thiele
Flying Dutchman Records albums
Gato Barbieri albums